James Hunter III (December 26, 1916 – February 10, 1989) was a United States circuit judge of the United States Court of Appeals for the Third Circuit.

Education and career

Born in Westville, New Jersey, Hunter received a Bachelor of Arts degree from Temple University in 1936. He received a Bachelor of Laws from the University of Pennsylvania Law School in 1939. He was in private practice of law in New Jersey from 1939 to 1971. He served in the United States Marine Corps from 1942 to 1946.

Federal judicial service

Hunter was nominated by President Richard Nixon on July 19, 1971, to a seat on the United States Court of Appeals for the Third Circuit vacated by Judge William Francis Smith. He was confirmed by the United States Senate on September 21, 1971, and received his commission on September 23, 1971. He assumed senior status on June 30, 1986. His service was terminated on February 10, 1989, due to his death.

Death

A resident of Medford, New Jersey, Hunter died of heart failure at the age of 72 on February 10, 1989, in a hospital in Mount Holly, New Jersey.

References

Sources
 

1916 births
1989 deaths
United States Marine Corps personnel of World War II
Judges of the United States Court of Appeals for the Third Circuit
New Jersey lawyers
People from New Jersey
People from Westville, New Jersey
Temple University alumni
United States court of appeals judges appointed by Richard Nixon
20th-century American judges
University of Pennsylvania Law School alumni
20th-century American lawyers